Parângu Mare ("Big Parângu") is a mountain peak in Romania. At 2,519 metres above sea level, it is the highest peak of the Parâng Mountains, located in the Parâng Mountains group of the Southern Carpathians. It is situated on the border of the Romanian counties of Gorj and Hunedoara. It is the most prominent peak in Romania (2,103 m), its parent mountain being Gerlachovský štít (2,655 m) in Slovakia.

Mountains
 Parâng Mountains (Munții Parâng) 
 Șureanu Mountains (Munții Șureanu/M. Sebeșului) 
 Cindrel Mountains (Munții Cindrel/M. Cibinului) 
 Lotru Mountains (Munții Lotrului; literally: Mountains of the Thief) 
 Căpățâna Mountains (Munții Căpățânii; literally: Mountains of the Head or Mountains of the Skull)

See also
 Parâng Mountains group
 Carpathian Mountains
 Retezat-Godeanu Mountains group
 Făgăraș Mountains group
 Rânca

References

External links
 Pictures and images from the Carpathian Mountains
 http://www.carpati.org/
 http://www.alpinet.org/
 "Vârful Parângul Mare, Romania" on Peakbagger

Mountains of Romania
Mountains of the Southern Carpathians